The Edgar Allan Poe Awards, popularly called the Edgars, are presented every year by the Mystery Writers of America, based in New York City. Named after American writer Edgar Allan Poe (1809–1849), a pioneer in the genre, the awards honor the best in mystery fiction, non-fiction, television, film, and theater published or produced in the previous year.

Active author categories

Robert L. Fish Memorial Award 
The Robert L. Fish Memorial Award was established in 1984 to honor the best first mystery short story by an American author. The winners are listed below.

Lilian Jackson Braun Award 
The Lilian Jackson Braun Award was established in 2022 to honor Lilian Jackson Braun and is presented in the "best full-length, contemporary cozy mystery as submitted to and selected by a special MWA committee."

Sue Grafton Memorial Award 
The Sue Grafton Memorial Award was established in 2019 to honor Sue Grafton and is presented to "the best novel in a series featuring a female protagonist." The winners are listed below.

Grand Master Award 
The Edgar Allan Poe Grand Master Award was established in 1955. The award "acknowledges important contributions to the genre as well as for a body of work that is both significant and of consistent high quality."

Raven Award 
The Raven Award was established in 1953 to honor "outstanding achievement in the mystery field outside of the realm of creative writing."

Ellery Queen Award 
The Ellery Queen Award was established in 1983 "to honor outstanding writing teams and outstanding people in the mystery-publishing industry." The winners are listed below.

Simon & Schuster Mary Higgins Clark Award 
The Simon & Schuster Mary Higgins Clark Award was established in 2001.

Active story categories

Critical/Biographical Work 
The Edgar Allan Poe Award for Best Critical/Biographical Work was established in 1977.

Fact Crime 
The Edgar Allan Poe Award for Best Fact Crime was established in 1948.

First Novel 
The Edgar Allan Poe Award for Best First Novel was established in 1946.

Episode in a Television Series 
The Edgar Allan Poe Award for Best Episode in a TV Series was established in 1952.

Juvenile 
The Edgar Allan Poe Award for Best Juvenile was established in 1961.

Novel 
The Edgar Allan Poe Award for Best Novel was established in 1954.

Paperback or eBook Original 
The Edgar Allan Poe Award for Best Paperback Original was established in 1970.

Short Story 
The Edgar Allan Poe Award for Best Short Story was established in 1951.

Young Adult Novel 
The Edgar Allan Poe Award for Best Young Adult Novel was established in 1989.

Discontinued categories

Book Jacket 
The Edgar Allan Poe Award for Best Book Jacket was established in 1955 discontinued in 1975.

Foreign Film 
The Edgar Allan Poe Award for Best Foreign Film was established in 1949 discontinued in 1966.

Motion Picture Screenplay 
The Edgar Allan Poe Award for Best Motion Picture Screenplay was established in 1946 and discontinued in 2009.

Mystery Criticism 
The Edgar Allan Poe Award for Outstanding Mystery Criticism was established in 1946 discontinued in 1967.

Play 
The Edgar Allan Poe Award for Best Play was established in 1950 and is irregular.

Radio Drama 
The Edgar Allan Poe Award for Best Radio Drama was established in 1946 and discontinued in 1960.

Special Award 
The Edgar Allan Poe Special Award was established in 1949 and is irregular.

Television Feature or Miniseries 
The Edgar Allan Poe Award for Best Television Feature of Miniseries was established in 1972 and discontinued in 2007.

See also 
 Edogawa Rampo Prize

References

External links

 Mystery Writers of America
 The official website of Edgar Awards (includes nominees)
 Edgar Allan Poe Awards at IMDb

Awards established in 1946
Mystery and detective fiction awards
American literary awards
Edgar Allan Poe
 
 
English-language literary awards